Abrera is a municipality in the comarca of the Baix Llobregat in Catalonia, Spain. It is situated in the valley of the Llobregat river, to the south-east of 
Montserrat, on the main A2 road between Barcelona and Lleida. The municipality is served by the FGC railway line from Martorell to Manresa: the S4 and R5 services stop at the station.

Abrera is home to The SEAT Sport factory.

Demography
According to Spanish census data, this is the population of Abrera in recent years.

References

 Panareda Clopés, Josep Maria; Rios Calvet, Jaume; Rabella Vives, Josep Maria (1989). Guia de Catalunya, Barcelona: Caixa de Catalunya.  (Spanish).  (Catalan).

External links
 Abrera's Town Hall
 Government data pages 

Municipalities in Baix Llobregat